USS Keppler has been the name of more than one United States Navy ship, and may refer to:

 , a destroyer escort canceled during construction in 1944
 , a destroyer escort canceled during construction in 1944

United States Navy ship names